Naked and Cold is the second album by hardcore punk band Advent. It was released in September, 2009.

Track listing 
 Intro (Instrumental) - 1:30
 Nothing - 2:02
 Overcome - 3:05
 Naked and Cold - 4:04
 Fatherless (Instrumental) - 3:14
 Pack of Fools - 2:05
 Revival - 2:57
 Crown of Thorns - 2:29
 Golgotha - 3:00
 Pierced with Grief - 3:31
 With Anger - 2:35
 Out of Line - 4:08
 Blackness of Day (Instrumental) - 7:15

Credits
Advent
 Joe Musten - Vocals
 Johnny Smrdel - Bass
 Matthew Harrison - Guitar
 Michael Rich - Guitar, Backing Vocals
 Chris Ankelein - Drums

Production
 Ryan Clark - Design
 Troy Glessner - Mastering
 Al Jacob - Engineer, Mixing, Producer
 Alberto Jacob - Engineer, Mixing, Producer
 Jamie King - Engineer, Producer
 Brian Kroll - A&R
 Ethan Luck - Photography
 Mitchell Marlow - Mixing, Producer

References 

2009 albums
Advent (band) albums
Solid State Records albums
Albums produced by Jamie King (record producer)